The Michelin PAX is an automobile run-flat tire system that utilizes a special type of rim and tire to allow temporary use of a wheel if its tire is punctured. The core of Michelin's PAX system is the semi-rigid ring installed onto the rim using special equipment. It provides support to the tire and its sidewall to allow emergency operation at limited speed until such time as the tire can be replaced. Cars that use the system include supercars like the Bugatti Veyron EB 16.4, luxury cars like the Rolls-Royce Phantom, and more common vehicles like the Honda Odyssey and Nissan Quest.

Prior technology 
Prior to the late 1990s introduction of the Michelin PAX System run-flat technology, both Michelin and Goodyear had introduced a "zero-pressure" run-flat technology, meaning that a pneumatic (air pressure-supported) tire could support itself with no air pressure. The new zero-pressure tire was a modified standard tire, constructed with a sidewall that was much stiffer and heavier, so as to support the weight of a car running at speed without careening out of control. The heavier sidewalls and special bead construction allowed a driver to drive a car with little or no air pressure at a limited speed (approximately 50 mph) over some specified distance to a service station, or at least off the roadway out of immediate danger. In a conventional pneumatic tire, loss of pressure at speed would result in the collapse of the soft tire sidewalls such that the metal wheel edges would slice through the collapsed sidewalls, which would likely result in an accident, possibly fatal, as well as the destruction of the tire, and possibly the wheel.

The reinforced sidewall Goodyear EMT (Extended Mobility Tire) was introduced with the 1994 Chevrolet Corvette. Michelin also introduced a similar tire in the mid-1990s called the Zero Pressure System, and the ZP designator differentiates this type of run flat tire from a conventional tire.

Such tires required the introduction of a Tire Pressure Monitoring System, sensors and instrumentation in the car, which would indicate to the driver a condition of dangerously low tire pressure. With conventional tires, low tire pressure can be noticed due to sidewall deformation; With reinforced sidewall zero-pressure run-flat type tires, there is no warning when a tire was going flat. This low or no-pressure condition was almost impossible to detect by the driver with a zero pressure run flat, until the tire failed.

Michelin PAX System run-flat tires 
Michelin developed the PAX system in the late 1995, first calling it PAV, but introduced the system as the PAX system in late 2000. The PAX system approached the problem differently, requiring a system of parts, not just a different tire. Rather than extra stiff and supportive sidewalls, the PAX system relies on a newly designed asymmetric wheel, a supportive insert and a similarly asymmetric tire combination to provide an extended run-flat capability of up to 125 miles at 50 or 55 mph.

The PAX system weighed approximately the same as four conventional tires plus a spare. So although comparable PAX tires were heavier than conventional counterparts, they were not that much heavier (Michelin claims four PAX System assemblies are equal to the weight of 4.7 standard tire-wheel assemblies). However, rotating mass and unsprung weight of the wheels and tires on the ground increased, which is a disadvantage. In addition, no spare tire had to be carried, so that PAX-equipped vehicles weighed no more than conventionally equipped vehicles, and had more storage space without the spare tire. Michelin said that the retail replacement cost of the PAX tires would be approximately equal to the cost of five conventional tires. The true cost was approximately US$1200 or $1600 for snow tires in 2008 for Odyssey which is higher than some conventional tires.  PAX tires allegedly had a smoother ride and provided better gas mileage than the comparable conventional tire but owner impressions vary greatly. PAX tires provided peace of mind and real safety and added mobility that no conventional tire could but limited availability and cost of PAX tires and service reduced owner satisfaction. As with the zero-pressure type run flats, a tire pressure monitoring system (TPMS) was mandatory.  TPMS became mandatory on all cars soon afterward.

The soft PAX sidewall allows for a more comfortable ride compared to run flat tires which work by having stiff sidewalls. When flat, the PAX tire sidewalls collapse until the weight of the car is riding on an internal polymer support ring mounted to an asymmetric wheel. That is the outside diameter of the wheel is smaller than the inside diameter of the wheel. This asymmetric wheel and tire design allows the tire to lock onto the wheel, rather than coming off at speed and/or while turning. So a PAX wheel that appears to be about 18 inches from the outside of the car (the side facing out), will look more like 19 inches on the inside of the wheel (the side facing the suspension). The inner support ring is also coated with a gel that is required to lubricate the rotating flat PAX tire.

A PAX tire may be patched from the inside as a conventional tire. If the tire is replaced, and the inner support ring is undamaged, the inner support ring need not be replaced. A new gel pack is generally applied when the tires are demounted and repaired or replaced.

PAX tires are measured in the metric system exclusively unlike the mixed English and metric measurements prevalent in conventional tires. For example a conventional passenger car tire might have the designation 245/45-18, indicating a tread section 245 mm wide, with an aspect ratio of 45% (i.e., the sidewall height is 45% the width of the tread section), mounted on an 18 inch conventional wheel. The similarly sized PAX tire was designated 245-680R460A, indicating the same 245 mm tread section, but a 680 mm overall diameter (a specification not in the conventional passenger car tire nomenclature), the R, meaning radial construction, a 460 mm wheel seat diameter (approximately 18.1 inches) and A for asymmetric, meaning that the wheel is asymmetric, or PAX system.

Special machinery and training is required to service the PAX tires. Michelin was confident enough in its service network that it guaranteed a replacement within 12 hours, if the Michelin dealer could not repair the original tire, or did not stock the replacement.  Michelin also worked with Honda (for the Odyssey minivan) and Acura (for the RL luxury sedan) to ensure each dealer carried a full set of replacements wheel tire combinations in inventory.  However, Canadian models of Odyssey did not offer PAX tires.

In theory, the PAX tire would not have the same proprietary issues that plagued the Michelin TRX tire that was introduced in the mid-1970s but died out in the 1980s. By licensing the PAX technology to other companies, Michelin would ensure that the consumer would not be locked into a single supplier as with the TRX. Pirelli, Goodyear, Toyo and Sumitomo have licensed the technology from Michelin, but these companies never came out with PAX system tires. So in reality, the consumer was still left with a single supplier solution.

Halt of development
In December 2007, Michelin announced that it would halt further development of the PAX tire, but would still produce them for the foreseeable future, essentially a repeat of the TRX scenario.

Class-action lawsuit in America 
A class-action suit against American Honda Motor Company involving the use of Michelin PAX tires was settled in December 2008. The settlement stated that the PAX tire system should continue to be used with cars originally equipped with PAX system. The original warranty was extended to 36,000 miles, although it is unclear as to whether it is the materials and workmanship portion of the warranty or the hazard insurance portion of the warranty, or both. Also left unanswered was what happens to the trip interruption payments, and the guarantee to get a replacement tire delivered within one day if the car is stranded beyond the 125-mile flat tire driving limit since PAX-certified repair shops are not as plentiful as standard tire repair shops. In addition, a spare tire kit would be offered by Honda for those cars originally equipped with the PAX system tires since servicing may be impractical in certain geographic areas. If a spare had already been purchased, Honda would reimburse the owner approximately $110.00. The deadline for class claims was in January 2010. Affected owners were referred to the sfmslaw.com web site, the attorneys responsible for the class action suit.

It appears that the major impetus for the class action was the poor tread-wear performance of the PAX tire on the Touring Edition of the third-generation Honda Odyssey minivan built for the North American market. The Michelin PAX system latitude LX4 tires apparently did not have the claimed lifetime, and the lack of universal repair and replacement facilities (PAX tires cannot be serviced at any tire shop, but only those with special equipment and specially trained personnel) and the cost to replace PAX tires were major factors for the class action.  Rather than alleging the PAX system was defective, the suit charged that the PAX tires and special wheels were unreasonably difficult to repair or replace.

Since the lawsuit was against both Michelin North America and American Honda, the American Honda luxury division Acura was also included.  Certain models of the Acura RL were equipped with higher-performance PAX system Michelin Pilot HX MM4 tires.  Anecdotally, informal internet searches will reveal that the Acura RL PAX tires did not have the poor wear performance experienced by the Honda Odyssey PAX tires.  However, many Acura RL owners did complain about the difficulty in seeking repair and replacement, as well as higher than expected repair or replacement costs.

The suit included consumer victims from Florida, Illinois, Arizona and New York. On December 20, 2010, the United States District Court for the District of Maryland granted final approval of the consumer class action.

Cars equipped with PAX tires

In the United States
 2005-2009 Honda Odyssey Touring models
 2006-2008 Nissan Quest models
 2006-2008 Acura RL model
 Rolls-Royce Phantom—introduced in April 2004

In Europe
 Bugatti Veyron EB 16.4
 Renault Scenic models in Europe—introduced in February 2002
 Audi A8 in Europe—introduced in November 2002
 Rolls-Royce Phantom—introduced in January 2003
 Audi A4 in Europe—introduced in September 2004
 Mercedes-Benz S-Class
 Lancia Thesis Blindata B6

References

External links
 
 Run-Flat Tires:A New Standard Rising - MSN Autos

Michelin brands
Tires